Avonlea may refer to:

Avonlea, Saskatchewan, a village in Saskatchewan, Canada
Avonlea Creek, a river in southern Saskatchewan
Avonlea Reservoir, a man-made lake in southern Saskatchewan
Avonlea Badlands, landform in Saskatchewan
Avonlea (Anne of Green Gables), a fictional town from Lucy Maud Montgomery's novel Anne of Green Gables
Road to Avonlea, a television series retitled Avonlea in some markets